"Big Enough" is a song by Australian singer-songwriter Kirin J. Callinan featuring Australian singer Alex Cameron, Australian whistler Molly Lewis, and Scottish-Australian singer Jimmy Barnes. American record label Terrible Records released a music video on 16 August and the single on 24 November 2017. The song is featured on Callinan's album Bravado, released on 9 June 2017.

"Big Enough" is famous for Barnes' screaming, which has turned into an internet meme.

Background

In an interview with Under the Radar, Callinan described his desire to include Barnes, which included receiving an e-mail with audio files of the famous screaming.

Pedestrian describes "Big Enough" as a mixture of The Man from Snowy River, Brokeback Mountain, and the Spaghetti Western genre of films.

Music video 

The music video for "Big Enough" released alongside the single in August 2017. Directed by Danny Cohen, the video takes place in an old west environment with wacky events. Molly Lewis appears in the video whistling to the sky, where a screaming, translucent Jimmy Barnes appears.

Internet meme

"Big Enough" became an internet meme by October 2017. The song features Barnes screaming, and the music video features him screaming in the sky. Many of the memes feature Barnes' image and vocals transplanted into various scenes in popular culture. Commenting on the recording of the track, Barnes simply stated he "screamed...like a banshee for...five minutes".

Personnel

• Kirin J. Callinan - voice, acoustic guitars, electric guitars

• Alex Cameron - voice, morals, ethics 

• Molly Lewis - human whiste  

• Jimmy Barnes  - human scream

• John Kirby - piano

• Aaron Cupples - keys, choir synth, arrangements, programming, wind

Nominations

References

External links
 

2017 songs
2017 singles
Kirin J. Callinan songs
Alex Cameron (musician) songs
Internet memes introduced in 2017
Jimmy Barnes songs
Songs written by Alex Cameron (musician)
Songs written by Kirin J. Callinan
Universal Records singles